7 Train can refer to:
 7 (New York City Subway service)
 7 Subway Extension, added to this route in 2015
 Paris Métro Line 7
 Line 7, Moscow Metro
 Line 7, Beijing Subway
 Line 7, Shanghai Metro
 Seoul Subway Line 7

See also
 Line 7 (disambiguation)